Family with sequence similarity 132, member A also known as adipolin is a protein that in humans is encoded by the FAM132A gene. Adipolin is an adipokine.

References

Further reading